Agostino Salvietti (28 August 1882 - 2 December 1967) was an Italian actor. He appeared in more than forty films from 1924 to 1964.

Filmography

References

External links 

1882 births
1967 deaths
Italian male film actors